Peter James Firth (born 12 July 1929) was the Bishop suffragan of Malmesbury from 1983 until 1994.

Firth was educated at Stockport Grammar School and Emmanuel College, Cambridge. He was ordained in 1955 and was a curate at St Stephen's Barbourne. Following this  he was priest in charge at the Church of the Ascension, Malvern and then Rector of St George's Gorton and in the early 1960's was a regular contributor to religious broadcasts at BBC Manchester.  From 1967 to 1983 he worked in various capacities for the Religious Broadcasting Unit at BBC South West. He was ordained to the episcopate by Robert Runcie, Archbishop of Canterbury, on 30 November 1983 at Southwark Cathedral. He retired in 1994 and is an honorary assistant bishop in the Diocese of Gloucester.

References

1929 births
Alumni of Emmanuel College, Cambridge
20th-century Church of England bishops
Bishops of Swindon (previously Malmesbury)
Living people
People educated at Stockport Grammar School